Omorgus howelli is a beetle of the Family Trogidae occurring in Florida and Texas. As of 2006 it is considered to belong to genus Omorgus, having previously been classified under the genus Trox.

References

External link

howelli
Beetles described in 1957